Shawnee Township is one of eleven townships in Fountain County, Indiana, United States. As of the 2010 census, its population was 672 and it contained 282 housing units.

Geography
It contains no incorporated settlements. The unincorporated communities of Aylesworth and Rob Roy both lie along the route of U.S. Route 41, while Fountain is in the far west on the east banks of the Wabash River. State Road 55 shares the route of U.S. 41 south from Attica until it reaches Rob Roy, at which point State Road 55 goes east while U.S. 41 continues south.

Cemeteries
Beulah Cemetery lies in the northeast part of the township; Brown Cemetery lies in the southwest.

References

 United States Census Bureau cartographic boundary files
 U.S. Board on Geographic Names

External links
 Indiana Township Association
 United Township Association of Indiana

Townships in Fountain County, Indiana
Townships in Indiana